Walter Lyndon Pope (January 26, 1889 – March 27, 1969) was a United States circuit judge of the United States Court of Appeals for the Ninth Circuit.

Education and career

Born in Valparaiso, Indiana, Pope received an Artium Baccalaureus degree from the University of Nebraska–Lincoln in 1909 and a Juris Doctor from the University of Chicago Law School in 1912. He was in private practice in Lincoln, Nebraska from 1912 to 1916. He was an assistant professor of law for the University of Nebraska–Lincoln from 1913 to 1916. He was a professor of law for the University of Montana from 1916 to 1948. He was in private practice in Missoula, Montana from 1917 to 1949. He was a member of the Montana House of Representatives in 1923 and was a Democrat. He was a special assistant to the Attorney General of the United States from 1937 to 1941.

Federal judicial service

Pope was nominated by President Harry S. Truman on February 14, 1949, to a seat on the United States Court of Appeals for the Ninth Circuit vacated by Judge Francis Arthur Garrecht. He was confirmed by the United States Senate on February 25, 1949, and received his commission on March 1, 1949. He served as Chief Judge and a member of the Judicial Conference of the United States in 1959. He assumed senior status on April 1, 1961. His service terminated on March 27, 1969, due to his death in a hospital in San Mateo, California. At the time of his death, he resided in Burlingame, California.

References

External links 
 

1889 births
1969 deaths
People from Valparaiso, Indiana
University of Nebraska alumni
University of Nebraska faculty
University of Chicago Law School alumni
Democratic Party members of the Montana House of Representatives
Judges of the United States Court of Appeals for the Ninth Circuit
United States court of appeals judges appointed by Harry S. Truman
20th-century American judges
Montana lawyers
Nebraska lawyers